{{DISPLAYTITLE:Previtamin D3}}

Previtamin D3 is an intermediate in the production of cholecalciferol (vitamin D3).  

It is formed by the action of UV light, most specifically UVB light of wavelengths between 295 and 300 nm, acting on 7-dehydrocholesterol in the epidermal layers of the skin.

The B ring of the steroid nucleus structure is broken open, making a secosteroid. This then undergoes spontaneous isomerization into cholecalciferol, the prohormone of the active form of vitamin D, calcitriol.

The synthesis of previtamin D3 is blocked effectively by sunscreens.

Interactive pathway map

References 

Vitamin D
Secosteroids
Indanes